Seremban City Council (abbreviated MBS) is the city council in Malaysia which administers Seremban, the state capital of Negeri Sembilan and the surrounding areas in the Seremban District since 1 January 2020. This agency is under the Negeri Sembilan State Government.

History

Seremban Sanitary Board and Seremban Town Board
The town of Seremban was previously administered by the Sanitary Board in 1897, which was upgraded into the Town Board in 1946 following rapid post-war development of the town.

Seremban Town Council, 1953–1979
Seremban Town Board was upgraded to the Seremban Town Council in 1953. From 1954 until 22 July 1965, the Seremban Town Council was led by a president in the office yearly, occasionally sitting for more than a year. Like all local governments in Malaysia, it held annual local elections during that period. On 23 July 1965, the Menteri Besar of Negeri Sembilan took over the post of the president of the Seremban Town Council, which subsequently became the president of the Seremban Municipal Council when the town of Seremban was accorded municipality status on 1 March 1979.

Seremban Municipal Council, 1979–2019
The trend of sitting Menteri Besar heading the council was overturned in 1998, when the head of the council was an independent individual.

Seremban District Council, 1979–2002
Meanwhile, the Seremban District Council was established on 1 January 1979 through the merger of 6 Local Authorities outside Seremban town itself, which are:

 Pajam Local Council (established in 1957)
 Mantin Local Council (established in 1958)
 Rantau Local Council Town Board (established in 1959)
 Nilai Local Council Town Board (established in 1959)
 Broga Local Council Town Board (established in 1959)
 Labu Local Council Town Board (established in 1959)

7 Presidents have led the council throughout its history.

Nilai Municipal Council, 2002–2019

The Seremban District Council was upgraded to the Nilai Municipal Council on 2 February 2002. It administered eight mukims (communes) in Seremban District and was led by 3 presidents before merger.

 Mukim Setul
 Mukim Labu
 Mukim Rantau
 Mukim Lenggeng
 Mukim Pantai
 Part of Rasah
 Part of Ampangan
 Part of metropolitan Seremban

Seremban City Council, 2020–present
Seremban Municipal Council and Nilai Municipal Council merged to form the Seremban City Council on 1 January 2020.

Functions
Like all local governments in Malaysia, MBS is responsible for public health and sanitation, waste removal and management, town planning, environmental protection and building control, social and economic development and general maintenance functions of urban infrastructure. The main headquarters is located at the 
intersection between Persiaran  Forest Heights 1 and Jalan Seremban-Tampin in Forest Heights, Rahang, immediately south of downtown Seremban. There are also branches at Bandar Baru Nilai, Jalan Keliling and Jalan Tengku Kursiah.

Mayor of the Seremban City Council

Departments 

The council is made up of 11 departments and 7 units as follows.

References

External links 

MBS Official Website

Seremban
City councils in Malaysia
Seremban